The Pohang Steelers (Hangul: 포항 스틸러스) are a South Korean professional football club based in Pohang, North Gyeongsang Province that compete in the K League 1, the top flight of South Korean football. The Steelers were founded on 1 April 1973 and were originally called POSCO FC after the steel-making company POSCO, which still owns the club today. They are one of South Korea's most successful teams, having won the K League five times and the AFC Champions League three times.

History
The club was founded on 1 April 1973 as the Pohang Iron and Steel Company Football Club (POSCO FC). Initially a semi-professional club, they turned professional in the 1984 season and changed its name to POSCO Dolphins. A year later they renamed as the POSCO Atoms. In 1986 they won their first Championship, and enjoyed a great spell of domination in the league; between 1985 and 1998 they were continuously in the top four of the K League.

In 1995 the club was renamed again, becoming the Pohang Atoms. This name change was an attempt to further strengthen local ties with the region, and in 1997 they adopted their current name, the Pohang Steelers. The team won the Asian Champions Cup in 1997 and 1998.

In the 2000s, the club struggled near the bottom of the table, but bounced back to the forefront of South Korean football by winning the first stage of the 2004 K League Championship. The club qualified for the final Championship match of the 2004 season, but lost 4–3 on penalties to Suwon Samsung Bluewings.

In 2007, the club won the Championship play-off by beating Seongnam Ilhwa Chunma, who finished in first place in the regular season of the K League. Pohang won the first leg 3–1 at home, and then traveled to Seongnam for the second leg game, recording a 1–0 victory to seal a 4–1 aggregate triumph. The Steelers had ended the K League season in fifth place, but then defeated Gyeongnam FC, Ulsan Hyundai Horang-i, Suwon Samsung Bluewings and finally Seongnam Ilhwa Chunma in the play-offs to win the championship.

Pohang again made the play-offs in the 2008 season by finishing the season in fifth place, but were knocked out in their play-off game by Ulsan Hyundai after the penalty shoot-out. However, the club fared much better in the 2008 Korean FA Cup. After beating Seongnam Ilhwa Chunma in the quarter-finals, Pohang knocked out Daegu FC in the semi-finals and then defeated Gyeongnam FC in the final to ensure qualification for the 2009 AFC Champions League.

In the 2009 AFC Champions League, the Steelers defeated Umm-Salal of Qatar 4–1 on aggregate in the semi-finals to advance to their first ever AFC Champions League final. The Steelers defeated Saudi club Al-Ittihad 2–1 at the National Stadium in Tokyo, Japan to claim the title. For the 2009 K League season, Pohang once again qualified for the play-off phase of the league by finishing the regular season in second place, equal with FC Seoul on points, but ahead on goal difference. The Steelers had a bye to the semi-finals, but lost to Seongnam Ilhwa Chunma. Nonetheless, their regular season placing saw them qualify for the 2010 AFC Champions League Group stage.

Following the conclusion of the 2009 K League season, at the 2009 FIFA Club World Cup in December, the Steelers finished in third place after defeating Mexican side Atlante 4–3 on penalties.

Kits 

In 1994, POSCO Atoms wore a green kit and a white kit with a multicoloured sun in the middle. In 1997, Pohang Steelers wore a white shirt with black stripes on the shoulders and black shorts. In 2000, the first kit consisted of a sky blue shirt and white shorts, while the away kit was a black and red hooped shirt with black shorts (similar to the current kit). In 2002 the kit was red with a black "V" on the chest.

Kit suppliers

Current squad

Out on loan

Honours

Domestic

League
 K League 1
Winners (5): 1986, 1988, 1992, 2007, 2013
Runners-up (4): 1985, 1987, 1995, 2004
 Korean National Semi-Professional Football League
Winners (5): 1975 Spring, 1981 Fall, 1982, 1986 Fall, 1988 Fall
Runners-up (2): 1977, 1989 Spring

Cups
 FA Cup
Winners (4): 1996, 2008, 2012, 2013
Runners-up (3): 2001, 2002, 2007
 League Cup
Winners (2): 1993, 2009
Runners-up (2): 1996, 1997s
 National Football Championship
Runners-up (2): 1977, 1985
 President's Cup
Winners (1): 1974
 Runners-up (1): 1989

International

Continental
 AFC Champions League
Winners (3): 1996–97, 1997–98, 2009
Runners-up (1): 2021
 Asian Super Cup
Runners-up (2): 1997, 1998
 A3 Champions Cup
Runners-up (1): 2005

Worldwide
 FIFA Club World Cup
Third place (1): 2009
 Afro-Asian Club Championship
Runners-up (2): 1997, 1998

Invitational
 DCM Trophy
 Winners (1): 1988
 Runners-up (1): 1989
 King's Cup
 Runners-up (1): 1987

Season-by-season records

Key
Tms. = Number of teams
Pos. = Position in league

AFC Champions League record

Club officials

Managers

 Names in italics indicates interim or caretaker manager

See also
List of football clubs in South Korea

References

External links

Official website

 
Association football clubs established in 1973
K League 1 clubs
Football clubs in North Gyeongsang Province
Pohang
POSCO
1973 establishments in South Korea
Works association football clubs in South Korea
AFC Champions League winning clubs